Shanghai Jiushi (Group) Co., Ltd. is a Chinese state-owned enterprise.

Jiushi is the parent of several public transport companies of Shanghai, including the operator of Shanghai Public Transport Card, as well as equity investments in several listed companies based in Shanghai. The company also has a subsidiary that was the organizer of Chinese Grand Prix which was held in Shanghai International Circuit.

History
In 1986, Shanghai Government was allowed to use a maximum of US$3.2 billion foreign currencies through borrowings which was the catalyst of establishing Shanghai Jiushi Corporation. According to the company, the name  had the same pronunciation of 94, which was the issue number of the document of the State Council regarding the use of such foreign currencies .  The company was incorporated on 12 December 1987 under the Law on Industrial Enterprises Owned by the Whole People. The Company Law of China was legislated in 1993.

Jiushi Group used the fund in Shanghai Metro, as well as other projects such as the renovation of Shanghai Hongqiao Airport.

In 2015 the company was re-incorporated as Shanghai Jiushi (Group) Co., Ltd., under the Company Law of China.

Subsidiaries

  (Former Ba-shi (Group), 100%)
 Shanghai Shen-Tie Investment (99.72%)
 Shanghai Shentong Metro Group (66.57%)
 Shanghai Shentong Metro (58.43%)
 Qiangsheng Holding (48.00%)
 Shanghai International Circuit (92%)
 Shanghai Transportation Investment (Group) Ltd
 Shanghai New Union Building Co.,Ltd.
 Shanghai Jiushi Properties Co.,Ltd.
 Shanghai Jiushi Investment Management Co.,Ltd.

Equity investments

 China Pacific Insurance Company (2.77%)
 Shanghai International Port Group (0.40%)

See also
 Shanghai Construction Group, fellow city-owned enterprise
 Shanghai Municipal Investment Group, fellow city-owned enterprise

References

External links
  

Chinese companies established in 1988
Companies owned by the provincial government of China
Companies based in Shanghai
Shanghai Metro
Transport in Shanghai
Transport companies of China